Trevor Wharetapu Patrick (born 2 September 1947) is a New Zealand former professional rugby league footballer who played in the 1960s and 1970s.

Before coming to Dunedin to taking physical education studies at the University of Otago in 1968, Patrick played rugby league in the Waikato town of Huntly. He was selected as a New Zealand Schoolboy Kiwi in 1963.

He also represented New Zealand Universities at rugby league between 1969 and 1984. His last appearance was as captain of the first NZU side to Great Britain and France in 1984. Two years later he coached New Zealand Universities to a win in the inaugural University Rugby League World Cup in Auckland.

His second son Hone Patrick, represented New Zealand Universities at rugby league in two matches in 2006, including the Test match against Australia Universities at Mt Smart Stadium.

International honours
Patrick represented New Zealand in 1969 against Australia, and in 1970 against Great Britain.

References

Living people
New Zealand national rugby league team players
New Zealand rugby league players
Otago rugby league team players
Place of birth missing (living people)
Rugby league five-eighths
1947 births
University of Otago alumni